This is a list of battalions of the Queen's Royal Regiment (West Surrey), which existed as an infantry regiment of the British Army from 1661 to 1959.

Original composition
When the 2nd (The Queen's Royal) Regiment of Foot became The Queen's (Royal West Surrey) Regiment in 1881 under the Cardwell-Childers reforms of the British Armed Forces, it became the county regiment of West Surrey, and one pre-existent militia and four volunteer battalions of West Surrey were integrated into the structure of the Queen's Royal Regiment. Volunteer battalions had been created in reaction to a perceived threat of invasion by France in the late 1850s. Organised as "rifle volunteer corps", they were independent of the British Army and composed primarily of the middle class.

Reorganisation

The Territorial Force (later Territorial Army) was formed in 1908, which the volunteer battalions joined, while the militia battalions transferred to the "Special Reserve". All volunteer battalions were renumbered to create a single sequential order.

First World War

The Queen's Royal Regiment fielded 28 battalions during the course of the war. The regiment's two territorial battalions formed duplicate second, third and fourth line battalions. As an example, the three-line battalions of the 4th King's were numbered as the 1/4th, 2/4th, 3/4th, and 4/4th respectively. Many battalions of the Queen's Royals were formed as part of Secretary of State for War Lord Kitchener's appeal for an initial 100,000 men volunteers in 1914. They were referred to as the New Army or Kitchener's Army. The 10th to 12th Queen's Royals, New Army "Service" battalions, were referred to as "Pals" because they were predominantly composed of colleagues. The Volunteer Training Corps were raised with overage or reserved occupation men early in the war, and were initially self-organised into many small corps, with a wide variety of names. Recognition of the corps by the authorities brought regulation and as the war continued the small corps were formed into battalion sized units of the county Volunteer Regiment. In 1918 these were linked to county regiments.

Inter-War
By 1920, all of the regiment's war-raised battalions had disbanded. The Special Reserve reverted to its militia designation in 1921, then to the Supplementary Reserve in 1924; however, its battalions were effectively placed in 'suspended animation'. As World War II approached, the Territorial Army was reorganised in the mid-1930s, many of its infantry battalions were converted to other roles, especially anti-aircraft. The regiment was also reassigned 22nd (County of London) and 24th battalions of the London Regiment, which disbanded in 1938; these became the 6th (Bermondsey) and 7th (Southwark) battalions of the regiment.

Second World War
The Queen's Royal's expansion during the Second World War was modest compared to 1914–1918. Existing battalions formed duplicates as in the First World War, while National Defence Companies were combined to create a new "Home Defence" battalion. In addition to this 19 battalions of the Home Guard were affiliated to the regiment, wearing its cap badge. By 1944 one anti-aircraft was also part of the regiment.  A Light Anti-Aircraft (LAA) troop was formed from the Southern Railways battalion to defend railways around Guildford and Woking. Due to the daytime (or shift working) occupations of these men, the batteries required eight times the manpower of an equivalent regular battery.

Post-World War II

In the immediate post-war period, the army was significantly reduced: nearly all infantry regiments had their first and second battalions amalgamated and the Supplementary Reserve disbanded. A defence review by Duncan Sandys in 1957 decided that the Queen's Royal Regiment would be amalgamated with the East Surrey Regiment, to form the Queen's Royal Surrey Regiment. They united as the 1st Battalion on 14 October 1959.

References

Queen's Royal Regiment (West Surrey)
Queen's Royal Regiment (West Surrey), List of battalions
Queen's Royal Regiment (West Surrey)
Queen's Royal Regiment (West Surrey)
Battalions